Uglichsky (masculine), Uglichskaya (feminine), or Uglichskoye (neuter) may refer to:
Uglichsky District, a district of Yaroslavl Oblast, Russia
Uglichsky (cheese), a Russian hard cheese made of cow's milk